Tetraphenylporphine sulfonate is a trypanocidal agent.

References

Antiparasitic agents
Tetrapyrroles
Sulfonic acids